Newbiggin may refer to several places in England:

in Cumbria
 Newbiggin, Ainstable, in the Eden district
 Newbiggin, Furness, in South Lakeland district
 Newbiggin, Hutton Roof, in the parish of Hutton Roof
 Newbiggin-on-Lune, in Eden district, near Kirkby Stephen
in Derbyshire
Newbiggin, a former name of Biggin (Dovedale and Parwich Ward)
in County Durham
 Newbiggin, Lanchester
 Newbiggin, Teesdale
in North Yorkshire 
 Newbiggin, Askrigg, on the north side of Wensleydale
 Newbiggin, south Wensleydale, on the south side of Wensleydale
in Northumberland
 Newbiggin-by-the-Sea

See also
Newbigging (disambiguation)